"Feedback" is a song by American hip-hop artist Kanye West from his seventh studio album The Life of Pablo (2016). It includes a sample of "Talagh" by Googoosh and West raps about his career experiences. The song charted on both the US Billboard Hot 100 and UK Singles Chart at number 99 and 92 respectively in 2016.

Composition
The song features a sample of 1975 track "Talagh" by Iranian singer Googoosh, which is used throughout it. Within the track, West raps about the fame and success that he has experienced throughout his career.

Once all of the changes to the featuring album had been made by June 2016, "Feedback" saw completely revamped production and this led to a longer running time than its original length.

Release

In May 2015, a viewer of one of West's fashion presentations posted a snippet of the song being played there and it was originally rumored to be titled either "Good News" or "A Long Time" before the track's title was officially announced and rumours also had for the snippet to be from his upcoming album that was scheduled to be released under the title of Swish at the time. "Feedback" was scheduled to not be part of The Life of Pablo at one point, since Travis Scott took to Twitter after West released the final track listing and thanked him for putting it back on the album.

Critical reception
Alexis Petridis of The Guardian voiced the belief that the song showed West as being self-aware, describing it as him "wondering aloud whether he's actually gone round the twist". Philip Lewis of Mic felt great about the confidence shown by West on the track.

Commercial performance
"Feedback" made its debut at number 99 on the US Billboard Hot 100 upon The Life of Pablo being released, but never managed chart again at any later date. As for the UK Singles Chart, it did the same there, debuting at number 92 upon the album's release and never reaching the top 100 again afterwards. In the same week as its debut on the Billboard Hot 100, the track debuted at number 36 on the US Hot R&B/Hip-Hop Songs chart. It fell down 10 places to number 46 the next week, then disappeared from the chart permanently.

Credits and personnel 
Credits adapted from West's official website.

Production – Kanye West
Co-production – Charlie Heat for Very Good Beats, Inc., & Noah Goldstein for Ark Productions, Inc.
Engineering – Noah Goldstein, Andrew Dawson, Anthony Kilhoffer & Mike Dean
Mix – Manny Marroquin at Larrabee Studios, North Hollywood, CA
Mix assisted – Chris Galland, Ike Schultz & Jeff Jackson

Charts

Certifications

References

2016 songs
Kanye West songs
Song recordings produced by Charlie Heat
Song recordings produced by Kanye West
Songs written by Chance the Rapper
Songs written by Charlie Heat
Songs written by Cyhi the Prynce
Songs written by Kanye West